Excelsior Maassluis is a football club from Maassluis, Netherlands, founded in 1918. The club's home ground is the 5,000 capacity arena known as Sportpark Dijkpolder. Excelsior won the Hoofdklasse of 2013 and became champions of the Topklasse just two years later. Also known as the Tricolores, Excelsior due to their 2016 title win, was promoted to the Tweede Divisie. As so in the division's inaugural season Excelsior ended up at fifth in the league's standings.

Current squad

Honours

Hoofdklasse: 2013
Topklasse: 2016

References

External links
 Official Twitter 

 
Football clubs in Maassluis
Association football clubs established in 1918
1918 establishments in the Netherlands